Lester Daniel Sherman (May 9, 1890 in Hubbardsville, New York – September 16, 1955 in Highland Park, Michigan), nicknamed "Babe", was a pitcher for the Chicago Federals professional baseball team in 1914.

External links

1890 births
1955 deaths
Chicago Whales players
Major League Baseball pitchers
Baseball players from New York (state)
Rochester Hustlers players
New London Planters players
Kalamazoo Celery Pickers players
Kalamazoo Kazoos players